Mission Valley High School is a public secondary school located 6 miles northeast of Eskridge, Kansas, United States.  It is operated by Mission Valley USD 330 public school district, and serves students of grades 9 to 12.

History
In 2008, it had an enrollment of 181.

The Northeast Kansas Amateur Astronomers’ League Inc. (NEKAAL) has a facility located on the school property: Farpoint Observatory is recognized internationally as the site of discovery of over 400 asteroids and one of the faintest comets discovered by an amateur astronomer.

See also
 List of high schools in Kansas
 List of unified school districts in Kansas

References

External links
 Mission Valley Jr./Sr. High School
 Mission Valley Schools USD 330

Schools in Wabaunsee County, Kansas
Public high schools in Kansas